Kipcorn  [kɪpkɔrn]  is a deep-fried food item from the Netherlands and a typical staple found at Dutch fast food restaurants, along with frikandels and krokets.

Kipcorns are rod-shaped and consist of a chicken or turkey meat slurry, breaded with a crust of corn or breadcrumbs. It is deep-fried and served hot. A classic kipcorn is usually served with ketchup, mayonnaise or curry sauce.

References 

Beef dishes
Deep fried foods
Dutch cuisine
Dutch words and phrases
Fast food
Meatballs
Poultry dishes
Snack foods